Nicholas David Thornicroft (born 23 January 1985) is an English first-class cricketer. He is a left-handed batsman and a right-arm medium-fast bowler, who played first-class cricket for Yorkshire County Cricket Club from 2002 until 2007.

Career
Thornicroft made his debut for the Yorkshire Cricket Board in 2001, in the Cheltenham & Gloucester Trophy. He played in his debut first-class match for Yorkshire County Cricket Club in the 2002 County Championship, although Yorkshire finished that season in bottom place in the First Division, being relegated to Division Two for the 2003 season. Thornicroft held the lowest first-class bowling average of the Yorkshire team in 2002. He was the youngest ever Roses Match debutant, that year, when he played for Yorkshire against Lancashire at the age of 17.

Thornicroft appeared in only one first-class match during the following season, although he played in five Youth One Day Internationals and three Youth Tests during the calendar year of 2003, both during an English tour of Australia, before coming back home and playing two Youth Tests against South Africa. Thornicroft spent 2004 and 2005 playing little first-class cricket, although he continued in a consistent vein of form when sent out on loan to Essex's Second XI.

During the 2006 season, Thornicroft played no first-class matches. He was subsequently released by Yorkshire in 2007.

Personal life
Thornicroft is a supporter of his hometown football club, York City F.C.

References

1985 births
Living people
Cricketers from York
English cricketers
Yorkshire cricketers
Essex cricketers
Yorkshire Cricket Board cricketers
English cricketers of the 21st century